Frankie Valli...Is the Word is an album by Frankie Valli, released in August 1978 on the Warner Bros. Records label.

Background, composition, and recording
Frankie Valli was chosen to sing the newly written theme song for the movie adaptation of the Broadway musical Grease. The single went to number one and was certified platinum. This album was released as a follow-up of the success of this song, its title echoing the chorus of the hit, "Grease is the word". The "Grease" theme, which had been  on the Grease soundtrack, was also included as the lead-off track on this album.

Reception
In a retrospective review, William Ruhlmann of Allmusic recalled that the album's release "served to demonstrate that 'Grease' was more of a phenomenon related to the movie and the Bee Gees than to Valli himself." In his November 1978 review for Stereo Review magazine, Peter Reilly remarked that:

Track listing
"Grease" (Barry Gibb) – 3:27
"Needing You" (Frankie Valli, Kevin Tighe, Lee Shapiro) – 3:24
"Sometimes Love Songs Make Me Cry" (Bill LaBounty, Jay Senter, Milo Adamo) – 4:26
"Without Your Love" (Kevin Tighe, Lenny Lee Goldsmith) – 4:10
"Over Me" (Bob Gaudio, Judy Parker) – 3:32
"Save Me, Save Me" (Albhy Galuten, Barry Gibb) – 3:26
"You Can Do It" (Ben Weisman, Evie Sands, Richard Germinaro) – 3:27
"A Tear Can Tell" (Bill LaBounty) – 3:55
"You Better Go" (Fred Webb, Lenny Lee Goldsmith) –  3:42
"No Love at All" (Frankie Valli, Kevin Tighe, Lee Shapiro) – 3:18

References

1978 albums
Frankie Valli albums
Warner Records albums
Albums produced by Bob Gaudio